Dargan may refer to:

Places
 Dargan, Iran (disambiguation), places in Iran
 Dargan, Maryland, an unincorporated place in the United States
 Dargan, New South Wales, a village in New South Wales, Australia
 Dargan Bridge, Dublin, two different bridges in Ireland

Other uses
 Dargan (surname)